George Moloney (7 March 1924 – 21 April 2005) was an  Australian rules footballer who played with South Melbourne in the Victorian Football League (VFL).

His older brother Vin Moloney also played for South Melbourne.

Notes

External links 

1924 births
2005 deaths
Australian rules footballers from Victoria (Australia)
Sydney Swans players